Lake Lavassaare is a lake of Estonia. Its area is 194,5 ha.

References

See also
List of lakes of Estonia

Lavassaare
Audru Parish
Landforms of Pärnu County